The North Wales Quarrymen's Union (NWQU) was a trade union in the United Kingdom.

History
The union was founded on 27 April 1874 at the Queen's Hotel, Caernarfon after a month of discussions between quarrymen from Dinorwic and other supporters. Initially the union was not led by miners but radical Liberals who later became supporters of David Lloyd George's Cymru Fydd
It affiliated with the Transport and General Workers' Union in 1923, but maintained a separate identity until 1960.

Leadership

General Secretaries
1874: William John Parry
1876: W. J. Williams
1897: J. E. Williams
1898: William H. Williams
1908: Robert Jones
1933: R. W. Williams
1946: Robert J. Jones
1957: A. Owen

Presidents
1874: Morgan Richards
1874: John Lloyd Jones
1876: William John Parry
1880: Robert Parry of Ceunant
1884: William John Parry
1890s: W. W. Jones
1903:

See also

 List of trade unions
 Slate industry in Wales
 TGWU amalgamations
 Transport and General Workers' Union

References

 Richard Merfyn Jones, The trade union and political activities of the North Wales slate quarrymen in relation to their social and working conditions: 1870-1905

Defunct trade unions of the United Kingdom
1874 establishments in Wales
Mining trade unions
Quarrying in Wales
Trade unions established in 1874
Trade unions disestablished in 1960
Transport and General Workers' Union amalgamations
Trade unions in Wales